Konrad Wolf (20 October 1925 – 7 March 1982) was an East German film director. He was the son of writer, doctor and diplomat Friedrich Wolf, and the younger brother of Stasi spymaster Markus Wolf. "Koni" was his nickname.

Biography
Because his father was Jewish and was an ardent and outspoken member of the German Communist Party (KPD) since 1928, he and his family left Germany via Austria, Switzerland, and France for Moscow when the Nazis took power in March 1933, where, arriving in March 1934, Wolf came into intense contact with Soviet film. 

At age 10, he played a minor role in the film Kämpfer, filmed among the German Communist emigrants in Moscow. In 1936, his family became Soviet citizens but then fell under suspicion leading to his father leaving for Spain in 1937 to serve as a doctor in the International Brigades during the Spanish Civil War. He and his older brother attended the Karl Liebknecht School in Moscow. 

He became friends with Louis Fischer's son Viktor Fischer and Wilhelm Wloch's son Lothar Wloch (1923–1976) who was later a German building contractor. In December 1942 at age 17, he volunteered into the Red Army, was sent to the front as an interpreter, served in the Caucasus campaigns, was present for the liberation of Warsaw, and was among the first troops to reach Berlin in 1945. After the war, he was a cultural officer at Halle and Berlin and was a reporter for the Berliner Zeitung which began publishing again on 21 May 1945. He remained in the Soviet Army until 1948. He later described these events in the 1968 film, Ich war neunzehn (I Was Nineteen).

Shortly after the war, Wolf returned to Moscow, where he studied at VGIK and was perplexed about whether he should be German or Russian and then live in Germany or the Soviet Union. His 1959 film Sterne (German: Stars) won the Special Jury Prize at the 1959 Cannes Film Festival. In 1961, his film Professor Mamlock was entered into the 2nd Moscow International Film Festival where it won the Golden Prize. 

His 1971 film, Goya or the Hard Way to Enlightenment was entered into the 7th Moscow International Film Festival where it won a Special Prize.

He worked afterwards as a film director at DEFA. He was honorary president of the Union of Art from 1959 until 1966, and president of the DDR Academy of Arts, Berlin from 1965 until his death in 1982.

In 1978, he was a member of the jury at the 28th Berlin International Film Festival. In 1980, his film Solo Sunny was entered into the 30th Berlin International Film Festival.

He was married to the actress Christel Bodenstein from 1960 to 1978.

Films 
1955: Once Is Never
1956: Genesung
1957: Lissy
1958/1972: Sun Seekers
1959: Stars
1960: 
1961: Professor Mamlock
1964: Divided Heaven
1966:  (TV film)
1968: I Was Nineteen
1971: Goya or the Hard Way to Enlightenment
1974: 
1976: Mama, I'm Alive
1979: Solo Sunny (co-director: Wolfgang Kohlhaase)
1981/1982: Busch singt (6-part documentary about Ernst Busch, completed by others)

See also
Konrad Wolf Prize

Notes

References

External links

 

1925 births
1982 deaths
East German film directors
People from Hechingen
Film directors from Berlin
Gerasimov Institute of Cinematography alumni
People from the Province of Hohenzollern
German people of Jewish descent
Refugees from Nazi Germany in the Soviet Union
20th-century German people
Soviet military personnel of World War II
Recipients of the Art Prize of the German Democratic Republic